Chinnayarasala Harijanawada is a small village in Kadapa district of the Indian state of Andhra Pradesh.  It is located in Porumamilla mandal of Rajampeta revenue division.

Education facilities 

An elementary school is in Chinnayarasala Harijanawada

Medical facilities 
Primary Health Center is in TekurPeta, two kilometers away from the nearest medical center.

Village photos

References

See also
Chinnayarasala Harijanawada village Ganesh festival video

Villages in Kadapa district